3,4-Methylenedioxyamphetamine (also known as MDA and sass) is an empathogen-entactogen, psychostimulant, and psychedelic drug of the amphetamine family that is encountered mainly as a recreational drug. In terms of pharmacology, MDA acts most importantly as a serotonin–norepinephrine–dopamine releasing agent (SNDRA). In most countries, the drug is a controlled substance and its possession and sale are illegal.

MDA is rarely sought after as a recreational drug compared to other drugs in the amphetamine family; however, it remains an important and widely used drug due to it being a primary metabolite, the product of hepatic N-dealkylation, of MDMA (ecstasy). In addition, it is common to find MDA as an adulterant of illicitly produced MDMA.

Uses

Medical
MDA currently has no accepted medical use.

Recreational
MDA is bought, sold, and used as a recreational 'love drug', due to its enhancement of mood and empathy. A recreational dose of MDA is sometimes cited as being between 100 and 160 mg.

Adverse effects
MDA produces serotonergic neurotoxic effects, thought to be activated by initial metabolism of MDA. In addition, MDA activates a response of the neuroglia, though this subsides after use.

Overdose

Symptoms of acute toxicity may include agitation, sweating, increased blood pressure and heart rate, dramatic increase in body temperature, convulsions, and death. Death is usually caused by cardiac effects and subsequent hemorrhaging in the brain (stroke).

Pharmacology

Pharmacodynamics
MDA is a substrate of the serotonin, norepinephrine, dopamine, and vesicular monoamine transporters, as well as a TAAR1 agonist, and for these reasons acts as a reuptake inhibitor and releasing agent of serotonin, norepinephrine, and dopamine (that is, it is an ). It is also an agonist of the serotonin 5-HT2A, 5-HT2B, and 5-HT2C receptors and shows affinity for the α2A-, α2B-, and α2C-adrenergic receptors and serotonin 5-HT1A and 5-HT7 receptors.

The (S)-optical isomer of MDA is more potent than the (R)-optical isomer as a psychostimulant, possessing greater affinity for the three monoamine transporters.

In terms of the subjective and behavioral effects of MDA, it is thought that serotonin release is required for its empathogen-entactogen effects, release of dopamine and norepinephrine is responsible for its psychostimulant effects, dopamine release is necessary for its euphoriant (rewarding and addictive) effects, and direct agonism of the serotonin 5-HT2A receptor is causative of its psychedelic effects.

Pharmacokinetics
The duration of the drug has been reported as about 6 to 8 hours.

Chemistry
MDA is a substituted methylenedioxylated phenethylamine and amphetamine derivative. In relation to other phenethylamines and amphetamines, it is the 3,4-methylenedioxy, α-methyl derivative of β-phenylethylamine, the 3,4-methylenedioxy derivative of amphetamine, and the N-desmethyl derivative of MDMA.

Synonyms
In addition to 3,4-methylenedioxyamphetamine, MDA is also known by other chemical synonyms such as the following:
 α-Methyl-3,4-methylenedioxy-β-phenylethylamine
 1-(3,4-Methylenedioxyphenyl)-2-propanamine
 1-(1,3-Benzodioxol-5-yl)-2-propanamine

Synthesis
MDA is typically synthesized from essential oils such as safrole or piperonal. Common approaches from these precursors include:
 Reaction of safrole's alkene functional group with a halogen containing mineral acid followed by amine alkylation.

 Wacker oxidation of safrole to yield 3,4-methylenedioxyphenylpropan-2-one (MDP2P) followed by reductive amination or via reduction of its oxime.
 Henry reaction of piperonal with nitroethane followed by nitro compound reduction.
Darzens reaction on heliotropin was also done by J. Elks, et al. This gives MDP2P, which was then subjected to a Leuckart reaction.

Detection in body fluids
MDA may be quantitated in blood, plasma or urine to monitor for use, confirm a diagnosis of poisoning or assist in the forensic investigation of a traffic or other criminal violation or a sudden death. Some drug abuse screening programs rely on hair, saliva, or sweat as specimens. Most commercial amphetamine immunoassay screening tests cross-react significantly with MDA and major metabolites of MDMA, but chromatographic techniques can easily distinguish and separately measure each of these substances. The concentrations of MDA in the blood or urine of a person who has taken only MDMA are, in general, less than 10% those of the parent drug.

Derivatives
MDA constitutes part of the core structure of the β-adrenergic receptor agonist protokylol.

History
MDA was first synthesized by C. Mannich and W. Jacobsohn in 1910. It was first ingested in July 1930 by Gordon Alles who later licensed the drug to Smith, Kline & French. MDA was first used in animal tests in 1939, and human trials began in 1941 in the exploration of possible therapies for Parkinson's disease. From 1949 to 1957, more than 500 human subjects were given MDA in an investigation of its potential use as an antidepressant and/or anorectic by Smith, Kline & French. The United States Army also experimented with the drug, code named EA-1298, while working to develop a truth drug or incapacitating agent. Harold Blauer died in January 1953 after being intravenously injected, without his knowledge or consent, with 450 mg of the drug as part of Project MKUltra. MDA was patented as an ataractic by Smith, Kline & French in 1960, and as an anorectic under the trade name "Amphedoxamine" in 1961. MDA began to appear on the recreational drug scene around 1963 to 1964. It was then inexpensive and readily available as a research chemical from several scientific supply houses. Several researchers, including Claudio Naranjo and Richard Yensen, have explored MDA in the field of psychotherapy.

Society and culture

Name
When MDA was under development as a potential pharmaceutical drug, it was given the international nonproprietary name (INN) of tenamfetamine.

Legal status

Australia
MDA is schedule 9 prohibited substance under the Poisons Standards. A schedule 9 substance is listed as a "Substances which may be abused or misused, the manufacture, possession, sale or use of which should be prohibited by law except when required for medical or scientific research, or for analytical, teaching or training purposes with approval of Commonwealth and/or State or Territory Health Authorities."

United States
MDA is a Schedule I controlled substance in the US.

Research
In 2010, the ability of MDA to invoke mystical experiences and alter vision in healthy volunteers was studied. The study concluded that MDA is a "potential tool to investigate mystical experiences and visual perception".

References

External links 
 Erowid MDA Vault
 MDA entry in PiHKAL
 MDA entry in PiHKAL • info

5-HT2A agonists
5-HT2B agonists
5-HT2C agonists
Benzodioxoles
Entactogens and empathogens
Euphoriants
Psychedelic drugs
Serotonin-norepinephrine-dopamine releasing agents
Serotonin receptor agonists
Stimulants
Substituted amphetamines
TAAR1 agonists
VMAT inhibitors